The Wallaville Branch Railway was a fifty kilometre railway line in Queensland, Australia. It was a branch line from Goondoon railway station (about twenty kilometres east of Gin Gin on the Mount Perry railway line in the Bundaberg Region of Queensland, Australia) southwest to Kalliwa Creek. It was approved in December 1914 to tap the Goodnight Scrub forests and to transport sugar cane to the Wallaville mill established in 1896.

Construction
Work began but was suspended in 1916. Construction resumed after World War I and the first stage to Wallaville was opened on 9 August 1920. Stops were established en route at Snake Creek, Bungadoo, Delan, Weithew, Berrembea, Drinan and Lallewoon. Two trains a week plied the route plus additional services during the sugar crushing season.

Extension
As an employment measure during the depression, the line was extended beyond Wallaville about 10 kilometres via Innes to Morganville but still well short of the original Kalliwa Creek proposal. Located near the banks of the Perry River, Morganville was named in honour of the Railways Minister Godfrey Morgan and after whom the town of Glenmorgan in southwest Queensland was also named. Passing through Innes Siding, the extension opened on 3 October 1931. The Morganville extension generated some year round traffic in hoop pine logs and cattle.

Closure
The Innes Siding to Morganville section closed on 1 November 1960 and from Wallaville to Innes closed on 1 May 1964.  It must be assumed that they were not viable. The remaining section from Goondoon to Wallaville closed from 15 June 1964. It was sold to the Wallaville sugar mill, which converted the majority to a two foot gauge sugar cane tramway.

References 

 Rod Milne "Wallaville Branch Line" ARHS Bulletin June 1997

External links 
 Article on Australian sugar cane locomotives
 1925 map of the Queensland railway system

Closed railway lines in Queensland
History of sugar
Railway lines opened in 1920
Railway lines closed in 1964
Sugar mill railways